Riana may refer to:

 Rhiannon, the horse goddess in Welsh mythology
 Riana Rouge, action-adventure game
 Riana, Tasmania, a small town in Australia

People with the given name Riana
 Riana Nel (born 1982) is a Namibian singer and songwriter
 Riana Scheepers (born 1957), Afrikaans author
 Marie Antoinette Riana Graharani, better known as The Sacred Riana (born 1992), Indonesian magician and illusionist; Asia's Got Talent (season 2) winner

See also
 Rhianna, a given name
 Rihanna (born 1988), pop music singer from Barbados
 The Sacred Riana (born 13 July 1992), magician/illusionist from Indonesia